Carbonation is the chemical reaction of carbon dioxide to give carbonates, bicarbonates, and carbonic acid.  In chemistry, the term is sometimes used in place of carboxylation, which refers to the formation of carboxylic acids.

In inorganic chemistry and geology, carbonation is common. Metal hydroxides (MOH) and metal oxides (M'O) react with CO2 to give bicarbonates and carbonates:
MOH  +  CO2  →   M(HCO3)
M'O  +  CO2  →   M'CO3

In reinforced concrete, the chemical reaction between carbon dioxide in the air and calcium hydroxide and hydrated calcium silicate in the concrete is known as neutralisation. The similar reaction in which calcium hydroxide from cement reacts with carbon dioxide and forms insoluble calcium carbonate is carbonatation.

Henry's law
Henry's law states that P=KBx where P is the partial pressure of  gas above the solution. KB is Henry's law constant. KB increases as temperature increases. x is the mole fraction of  gas in the solution. According to Henry's law carbonation increases in a solution as temperature decreases.

Since carbonation is the process of giving compounds like carbonic acid (liq) from CO2  (gas) {i.e. making liquid from gasses} thus the partial pressure of CO2  has to decrease or the mole fraction of CO2 in solution has to increase {P/x  = KB} and both these two conditions support increase in carbonation.

References

Inorganic chemistry
Organometallic chemistry
Transition metals
Coordination complexes